Nordine Oubaali (Arabic: نوردين أوبالي) (born 4 August 1986) is a Moroccan former professional boxer who competed from 2014 to 2021. He held the WBC bantamweight title from 2019 to 2021. As an amateur he won a bronze medal in the light-flyweight division at the 2007 World Championships.

Amateur career
Oubaali is the 13th child of 18 siblings in total. In 2006 he became French champion. At the 2007 World Championships the southpaw bested Arginian Junior Zarate (RSCO), Spaniard José Kelvin de la Nieve 33:12, and Georgiy Chygayev (UKR) 25–9. In the semis he was overwhelmed by Chinese top favorite Zou Shiming. At the 2008 Olympics he beat Rafikjon Sultonov 8:7 and almost shocked local superstar Zou Shiming but lost 3-3+ (jury decision). For the 2012 Summer Olympics, he moved up to flyweight (52 kg).  He beat Ajmal Faisal in the first round, Rau'Shee Warren in the second but then lost to Ireland's Michael Conlan in the quarterfinal.

Professional career

Early career
Oubaali made his professional debut against Sergey Tasimov on March 20, 2014. He won the fight by unanimous decision. Oubaali amassed an 11–0 record during the next two years, with eight victories coming by way of stoppage. Oubaali faced Alejandro Hernandez on June 2, 2017, for the vacant WBC Silver bantamweight title. He won the fight by a tenth-round technical knockout. He made his first and only title defense against Mark Anthony Geraldo on December 16, 2017, whom he beat by a seventh-round knockout. Oubali faced Luis Melendez in a non-title bout on April 7, 2018. He won the fight by a second-round knockout.

WBC Bantamweight champion

Oubaali vs. Warren
On November 21, 2018, it was announced by the WBC that Nordine Oubaali would face Rau'shee Warren for the vacant WBC bantamweight title. Warren was ranked #1 by the WBC at bantamweight. The bout was scheduled for the undercard of the PBC on Fox card on December 22, 2018, at the Barclays Center in New York City. It was not slated for network broadcast. The two of them previously fought as amateurs in the first round of the 2012 Olympic Games, with Oubaali winning by decision. The bout was postponed on December 4, 2018, to allow Oubaali's coach and brother Ali to corner Estelle Mossely on December 22. The Oubaali and Warren fight was instead rescheduled for the Manny Pacquiao vs. Adrien Broner undercard on January 19, 2019, at the MGM Grand Garden Arena in Las Vegas, Nevada. Oubaali was a -379 betting favorite, while Warren entered the fight as a +319 underdog.

Oubaali captured the vacant title by unanimous decision, with scores of 115–113, 116–112, and 117–111. He spent the majority of the fight pressuring and controlling the pace, while Warren found most success in the fifth, seventh and eleventh rounds. Warren acknowledged the flow of the fight in his post-fight interview, stating: "He wanted it more...He had his foot on the gas".

Oubaali vs. Villanueva
Oubaali was scheduled to make the first defense of his WBC bantamweight title against the one-time IBF and WBO title challenger Arthur Villanueva. Villanueva was ranked number 15 by the WBC at bantamweight. The fight was scheduled as the main event of an ESPN+ card, which took place on July 6, 2019, at the Barys Arena in Nur-Sultan, Kazakhstan. Oubaali was a significant -3500 favorite heading into the bout, while Villanueva came in as a +1200 underdog. He won the fight by a sixth-round stoppage. Oubaali dominated from the start, causing a swelling to appear above Villanueva's left eye and knocking the Philippine fighter with an uppercut-right hook combination in the sixth round. Villanueva retired from the fight at the end of the sixth round.

Oubaali vs. Inoue
Oubaali was scheduled to make his second WBC bantamweight title defense against the interim bantamweight champion Takuma Inoue. Inoue achieved the status of a mandatory challenger on September 11, 2018, with a unanimous decision victory against Mark John Yap. As he was forced to wait for the result of the Oubaali and Warren fight, Inoue furthermore fought and defeated Petch Sor Chitpattana on December 30, 2018, to become the WBC interim bantamweight champion. The fight between Oubaali and Inoue was scheduled for the undercard of the Naoya Inoue and Nonito Donaire WBSS final, which was held on November 7, 2019, at the Saitama Super Arena in Saitama, Japan. Oubaali outpointed Inoue to retain his WBC title. Oubaali scored the sole knockdown of the fight in the third round, when he dropped Inoue with a left hook. Although he was unable to finish his opponent, Oubaali nonetheless won by a comfortable decision, with scores of 117–110, 120-107 and 115–112.

Oubaali vs. Donaire
Oubaali was scheduled to make his third WBC title defense against the former four-weight world champion Nonito Donaire. Donaire was ranked number 1 by the WBC at bantamweight. The fight was scheduled for December 12, 2020, at the Mohegan Sun Arena in Uncasville, Connecticut. Oubaali withdrew from the fight on November 13, 2020, following a positive COVID-19 test. He was replaced by Emmanuel Rodríguez, who was to face Donaire on December 19, 2020. On December 9, 2020, Donaire was forced to withdraw from the Rodriguez fight, as he had tested positive for COVID-19 as well. The fight between Oubaali and Donaire was rescheduled for May 29, 2021, as the main event of the PBC card held at the Dignity Health Sports Park in Carson, California. Donaire won the fight by a fourt-round knockout. Oubaali was knocked down twice in the third round, before getting finished with a hook-straight-uppercut combination in the fourth round.

This would prove to be the last fight of his professional career, as Oubaali officially announced his retirement from the sport on April 5, 2022.

Professional boxing record

See also
List of world bantamweight boxing champions

References

External links

Chicago results
Nordine Oubaali - Profile, News Archive & Current Rankings at Box.Live

1986 births
Living people
French sportspeople of Moroccan descent
Sportspeople from Pas-de-Calais
French male boxers
Bantamweight boxers
World bantamweight boxing champions
World Boxing Council champions
Olympic boxers of France
Boxers at the 2008 Summer Olympics
Boxers at the 2012 Summer Olympics
AIBA World Boxing Championships medalists
Mediterranean Games medalists in boxing
Mediterranean Games gold medalists for Morocco
Competitors at the 2009 Mediterranean Games